Megachile philinca is a species of bee in the family Megachilidae. It was described by Theodore Dru Alison Cockerell in 1912.

References

Philinca
Insects described in 1912